Phineas P. Paist (August 28, 1873 – May 2, 1937) was an American architect who was the supervising architect for the Coral Gables Corporation.

Paist was an architect working for S. Gifford Slocum at age 20.  In 1893 he became an associate of G. W. & W. D. Hewitt.  He later worked as an associate architect to Paul Chalfin in building the Villa Vizcaya in Florida.

Some of his projects
 Douglas Entrance, 1924, Coral Gables, FL. On the U.S. National Register of Historic Places. With Denman Fink and Walter De Garmo.
 Venetian Pool, 1925, Coral Gables, FL. On the U.S. National Register of Historic Places. With Denman Fink.
 Colonnade Building, 1926, Coral Gables, FL. With Walter De Garmo and Paul Chalfin.
 San Sebastian Apartment Hotel, 1926, Coral Gables, FL.
 Coral Gables City Hall, 1928, Coral Gables. On the U.S. National Register of Historic Places. With Harold Steward.
 Old United States Courthouse, 1931, Miami, FL. On the U.S. National Register of Historic Places.
 Coral Gables Police and Fire Station, 1939, Coral Gables, FL. On the U.S. National Register of Historic Places.
 Charles Deering Estate. On the U.S. National Register of Historic Places.

References
Notes

Bibliography

 Behar, Roberto M., ed. Coral Gables. Paris, France: Editions Norma, 1997. 
 Patricios, Nicholas N. Building Marvelous Miami. Gainesville, FL: University Press of Florida, 1994. .
 article on Piast

1873 births
1937 deaths
Architects from Florida
20th-century American architects
Architects from Philadelphia
19th-century American architects